The Creature Walks Among Us is a 1956 American monster horror film and the third installment of the Creature from the Black Lagoon series from Universal Pictures, following the previous year's Revenge of the Creature. The film was directed by John Sherwood, the long-time Universal-International assistant director, in his directorial debut. Jack Arnold, who had directed the first two  films in the series, had moved on to "A-list" films, and felt he had no more to contribute to the horror genre. He suggested that his assistant director, Sherwood, could move up to full director, which partly affected Universal's decision to allow him to direct the film. The Creature Walks Among Us starred Jeff Morrow, Rex Reason, Leigh Snowden, Gregg Palmer, and Maurice Manson. The Creature was played by Don Megowan on land, and for his final appearance as the Gill-man, played by Ricou Browning underwater. Like the original Creature from the Black Lagoon, it had music composed by Henry Mancini, who at the time was under contract with Universal. It is considered to be the last film in the Universal Classic Monsters series.

Plot
Following the Gill-man's escape from Ocean Harbor Oceanarium in Florida, a team of scientists led by the deranged and cold-hearted Dr. William Barton (Jeff Morrow) board the Vagabondia III to capture the creature in the Everglades. Barton is mentally unstable and apparently an abusive husband to his wife Marcia (Leigh Snowden), as he becomes very jealous and paranoid when Marcia is with other men. Their guide Jed Grant (Gregg Palmer) makes numerous passes on Marcia (which she constantly rebuffs), with Barton becoming paranoid about the two.

Marcia accompanies Jed and Dr. Tom Morgan (Rex Reason) on their initial dive to look for the Gill-man, despite her husband's fierce objections. During the dive, Marcia swims too deep and is overcome with the "raptures of the deep", temporarily losing her mind, removing all her scuba gear. This forces Jed and Tom to abandon their hunt for the Gill-man to swim back and save her.

When he is eventually captured, the Gill-man is badly burned in a fire leading to a surgical transformation performed by Barton, Tom and their colleagues Dr. Borg (Maurice Manson) and Dr. Johnson (James Rawley). While bandaging the Gill-man, the doctors notice that he is shedding his gills and even breathing using a kind of lung system. Now that the creature has more human-like skin, he is given clothing. The doctors attempt to get the Gill-man used to living among humans. Although his life is saved, he is apparently unhappy, staring despondently at the ocean.

Barton ruins the plans when, in a murderous rage, he kills Jed, jealous that he had made romantic advances towards his wife. Realizing what he has done, Barton then tries to put the blame on the Gill-man. The Gill-man, witnessing the killing, and apparently realizing that he is being blamed for the murder, goes on a rampage. After ripping down the confining electric fence, he kills Barton and then slowly walks back to the sea. He is last seen on a beach, advancing towards the ocean.

Cast

 Jeff Morrow as Dr. William Barton
 Rex Reason as Dr. Thomas Morgan
 Leigh Snowden as Marcia Barton
 Gregg Palmer as Jed Grant
 Maurice Manson as Dr. Borg
 Ricou Browning as Gill-man – in water
 Don Megowan as Gill-man – on land
 James Rawley as Dr. Johnson
 Paul Fierro as Morteno
 Lillian Molieri as Mrs. Morteno 
 David McMahon as Captain Stanley

Production

Unlike the previous two Creature films, The Creature Walks Among Us was not filmed in 3-D. The underwater scenes were filmed at Wakulla Springs in North Florida, today a state park. Other locations in Florida were also utilized for location shooting. Principal photography ran from late August to mid-September 1955.

Reception

Bosley Crowther of The New York Times reviewed The Creature Walks Among Us as a return to the "merman" series: "The producers have captured some misty but pictorial underwater footage and that the Messrs. Morrow and Reason, and Gregg Palmer, who plays a guide with a yen for the blonde and statuesque Miss Snowden, behave fairly well in decidedly unusual circumstances. The "creature", of course, is frightening enough to scare the scales off a tarpon. However, he apparently hasn't terrified his Hollywood discoverers".

Home media

Universal Studios released The Creature Walks Among Us on DVD in a boxed set along with Creature from the Black Lagoon and Revenge of the Creature, and added a bonus behind-the-scenes documentary on the famous trilogy.

See also
 List of American films of 1956

References
Notes

Bibliography

 Weaver, Tom, David Schecter and Steve Kronenberg. The Creature Chronicles: Exploring the Black Lagoon Trilogy. Jefferson, North Carolina: McFarland & Company Inc., 2014. .

External links

 
 
 

1956 films
American science fiction horror films
1950s monster movies
American black-and-white films
Universal Pictures films
1956 horror films
1950s science fiction horror films
American sequel films
American monster movies
1950s English-language films
1950s American films
Films scored by Heinz Roemheld
Films scored by Henry Mancini